Erie–Ottawa International Airport, (Carl R. Keller Field)  is three miles east of Port Clinton, in Ottawa County, Ohio. It is owned by the Erie–Ottawa Airport Authority. The National Plan of Integrated Airport Systems for 2011–2015 categorized it as a general aviation facility.
On November 9, 2013, Erie–Ottawa Airport obtained approval to handle international flights.

Most U.S. airports use the same three-letter location identifier for the FAA and IATA, but this airport has no IATA code.

Facilities
The airport covers 169 acres (68 ha) at an elevation of 590 feet (180 m). It has two asphalt runways: 9/27 is 5,646 by 100 feet (1,721 x 30 m) and 18/36 is 4,001 by 75 feet (1,220 x 23 m).

In the year ending May 19, 2009 the airport had 16,550 aircraft operations, average 45 per day: 60% general aviation, 39% air taxi, and <1% military. 26 aircraft were then based at the airport: 92% single-engine and 8% multi-engine.

The airport is home to the Liberty Aviation Museum.

Airlines and destinations

References

External links 
 Erie–Ottawa International Airport, official site
 Aerial image as of May 1995 from USGS The National Map
 

Airports in Ohio
Transportation in Ottawa County, Ohio
Buildings and structures in Ottawa County, Ohio